The Electric Michelangelo is a book written in 2004 by Sarah Hall. The main character, Cy Parks, is a tattoo artist and the book follows his life and dreams. It was longlisted for the Orange prize. The book was shortlisted for the Man Booker Prize in 2004.

References

 2004 novels